is a Japanese actor. He is represented with Beacon Lab Entertainment.

Biography
When he was young Asari danced to his parents' clapping after watching Charlie Chaplin's films and joined Gekidan Tohai, and debuted at the age of four in a television advertisement, and later he became a child actor. Afterward he moved to Beacon Lab Entertainment.

In 1999, Asari played the childhood role of the heroine's rival (Shusaku Tsuda, Hakase) in the Asadora Asuka, and he played the young Giraffe, the main character of the film Eien no Ko in 2000, and he continues to act in dramas since his childhood.

In 2001, he gained attention when he played the juvenile delinquent Ippei in Kids War 3.

Asari made his first leading role in a film was Tenohira no Shiawase, and his first starring role in a television drama in Hitori janai the following year.

On 17 December 2015, it was reported that he married a non-celebrity woman who was his classmate in university.

Filmography

TV dramas

Films

Stage

Puppetry

Internet dramas

Variety

Documentaries

Music videos

Advertisements

References

External links
 – Beacon Lab Entertainment 
 – Ameba Blog 

1987 births
Living people
Japanese male child actors
Japanese male film actors
Japanese male stage actors
Japanese male television actors
Male actors from Tokyo
20th-century Japanese male actors
21st-century Japanese male actors